Sinú may refer to:

 Sinú River, Colombia
 The Zenú, also known as Sinú, peoples of Colombia
 "Sinu" (Masterpiece song), a 2009 song by Malaysian band Masterpiece

See also
 Sinew, a tough band of fibrous connective tissue that connects muscle to bone
 Sinus (disambiguation)
 Sino (disambiguation)